Portuguese in the Netherlands (also known as Portuguese Dutch or the Dutch Portuguese Community) are the citizens or residents of the Netherlands whose ethnic origins lie in Portugal.

Demographics
Portuguese Dutch are Portuguese-born citizens with a Dutch citizenship or Dutch-born citizens of Portuguese ancestry or citizenship.

Portuguese arrived to the Netherlands in the early and middle 18th century, as immigrants, mostly from Madeira Island and Lisbon. Prior to 1975, Cape Verdean immigrants were registered as Portuguese immigrants from the overseas province of Portuguese Cape Verde.

Over 20,000 of Dutch people claim that they are of Portuguese descent.

Notable people
Fatima Moreira de Melo
Fernando Pereira

See also 
Netherlands–Portugal relations

References

Ethnic groups in the Netherlands